Desovo is a village in the municipality of Dolneni, North Macedonia.

History 
The village of Desovo was a center of the Albanian Movement in the area. In September 1912, Serb majors M. Vasić and Vasilije Trbić, a Chetnik commander operating from Porečje region, gathered 30 Chetniks and travelled to the village of Desovo where they shot 111 Albanian men and razed the village. Desovo was once again razed in 1929 by Serb Chetnik bands active in the region. The event led to the first wave of migrations of Desovo Albanians mainly to Turkey, with some others going abroad to the United States and Australia. In 1948 Desovo numbered around 1,500 inhabitants mostly Albanians. Due to the sociopolitical pressures experienced within post war communist Yugoslavia under Aleksandar Ranković, between 1963–1968 most of the remaining Albanians in Desovo migrated to Turkey. In the 21st century,  the village population is made up of Macedonians, Bosniaks and national Albanian sentiments among remaining Albanians have somewhat dissipated with assimilation being an issue. An Albanian school functions for the small Albanian community.

Demographics

In statistics gathered by Vasil Kanchov in 1900, the village of Desovo was inhabited by 40 Bulgarian Christians, 75 Romani and 625 Muslim Albanians.

According to the 2021 census, the village had a total of 1.108 inhabitants. Ethnic groups in the village include:

Bosniaks 603
Albanians 347
Macedonians 76
Turks 8
Others 74

References

External links

Villages in Dolneni Municipality
Albanian communities in North Macedonia